The 2015 Florida State Seminoles football team, variously Florida State or FSU, represented Florida State University in the sport of American football during the 2015 NCAA Division I FBS college football season. Florida State competed in the Football Bowl Subdivision (FBS) of the National Collegiate Athletic Association (NCAA). The Seminoles were led by sixth-year head coach Jimbo Fisher and played their home games at Bobby Bowden Field at Doak Campbell Stadium in Tallahassee, Florida. They were members of the Atlantic Coast Conference, playing in the Atlantic Division. It was the Seminoles' 24th season as a member of the ACC and its 11th in the ACC Atlantic Division.

Florida State came into the season after a two-year run (2013 and 2014) in which the Seminoles won 27 games with a pair of ACC Championships, a BCS National Title, an appearance in the College Football Playoff, a Heisman Trophy winner, and eighteen NFL Draft selections.

They finished the season 10–3, 6–2 in ACC play, to finish in second place in the Atlantic Division. They were invited to the Peach Bowl where they lost to Houston.

Florida State seniors – Giorgio Newberry, Derrick Mitchell, Nile Lawrence-Stample, Reggie Northrup, Terrance Smith, Tyler Hunter, Javien Elliott, Keelin Smith, Lamarcus Brutus and Cason Beatty – ended their college careers with 49 wins over the course of four seasons, becoming the winningest class in school history.

Before the season

Previous season

Florida State ended the 2014 season with a 13–1 record (8–0 in ACC play), winning the conference championship and appearing in the playoff. They were led by Jimbo Fisher in his fifth year as head coach.

Returning

Offense

The Seminoles returned three starters on offense:
 Sean Maguire
 Dalvin Cook
 Mario Pender
 Travis Rudolph
 Ermon Lane
 Roderick Johnson
 Ryan Hoefield
 Freddie Stevenson
 Kermit Whitfield
 Jesus Wilson

Defense

The Seminoles returned seven starters on defense:
 Nile Lawrence-Stample
 Jalen Ramsey
 Lorenzo Featherston
 DeMarcus Walker
 Matthew Thomas
 Jacob Pugh
 Nate Andrews
 Trey Marshall
 Derrick Mitchell
 Reggie Northrup
 Terrance Smith
 Tyler Hunter
 Chris Casher
 Derrick Nnadi
 Marquez White
 Lamarcus Brutus

Special teams

The Seminoles returned two starters on special teams:
 Roberto Aguayo
 Cason Beatty

Departures

Offense
 Jameis Winston
 Rashad Greene
 Nick O'Leary
 Karlos Williams
 Christian Green
 Josue Matias
 Cameron Erving
 Tre' Jackson
 Bobby Hart
 Austin Barron

Defense
 Desmond Hollin
 P. J. Williams
 Mario Edwards Jr.
 Ronald Darby
 Eddie Goldman

Transfers
Everett Golson (from Notre Dame)

Offense
Ruben Carter (to Toledo)
John Franklin III (to East Mississippi CC/Auburn)
Isaiah Jones (to East Mississippi CC)

Defense
 E.J. Levenberry (to Connecticut)

Recruiting class
Calvin Brewton, George Campbell, Derwin James, De'Andre Johnson, Jacques Patrick, Da'Vante Phillips and Josh Sweat were early enrollees.

Coaching changes
After the 2014 season, defensive ends coach Sal Sunseri took a job with the Oakland Raiders. He was replaced by University of Florida assistant Brad Lawing.

Spring game

Personnel

Coaching staff

Roster
Freshman quarterback De'Andre Johnson was dismissed from the team after being charged with a misdemeanor.
{| class="toccolours" style="text-align: left;"
|-
| colspan="11" style="background:#CEB888; color:#782F40; text-align:center;"| 2015 Florida State Seminoles
|-
|valign="top"|

Quarterback
 6  Everett Golson –  Senior (6'0, 199)
 10 Sean Maguire –  Junior (6'3, 221)
 12 Deondre Francois - Freshman (6'1, 203)
 16 J.J. Cosentino –  Freshman (6'4, 239)

Running back
 4 Dalvin Cook – Sophomore (5'11, 202)
 7 Mario Pender –  Junior (5'10, 196)
 9 Jacques Patrick – Freshman (6'2, 235)
 23 Freddie Stevenson – Junior (6'1, 241) (FB)
 26 Jonathan Vickers – Sophomore (6'1, 226)

Wide receiver
 1 Ermon Lane – Sophomore (6'3, 205)
 3 Jesus Wilson – Junior (5'10, 185)
 5 Da'Vante Phillips – Freshman (6'1, 210)
 8 Kermit Whitfield – Junior (5'8, 184)
 11 George Campbell – Freshman (6'4, 202)
 13 Ja'Vonn Harrison – Sophomore (6'2, 202)
 15 Travis Rudolph – Sophomore (6'1, 186)
 18 Auden Tate – Freshman (6'5, 216)
 80 Nyqwan Murray – Freshman (5'11, 171)
 87 Jared Jackson  –  Sophomore (6'2, 196)

Tight end
 81 Ryan Izzo –  Freshman (6'5, 241)
 83 Jalen Wilkerson – Freshman (6'4, 253)
 85 Jeremy Kerr –  Sophomore (6'6, 266)
 88 Mavin Saunders –  Freshman (6'5, 248)

|width="25"| 
|valign="top"|

Offensive line
 52 David Robbins – Freshman (6'4, 322)
 54 Alec Eberle –  Freshman (6'4, 294)
 55 Chad Mavety –   Junior (6'5, 337)
 57 Corey Martinez –  Freshman (6'4, 295)
 59 Ryan Hoefield –  Sophomore (6'2, 299)
 62 Ethan Frith – Freshman (6'7, 299)
 70 Cole Minshew – Freshman (6'5, 340)
 71 Brock Ruble –  Freshman (6'8, 307)
 72 Kareem Are –  Junior (6'6, 334)
 74 Derrick Kelly Jr. –  Freshman (6'5, 312)
 75 Abdul Bello – Freshman (6'6. 307)
 77 Roderick Johnson – Sophomore (6'7, 323)
 78 Wilson Bell –  Sophomore (6'5, 316)

Defensive line
 4 Giorgio Newberry –  Senior (6'6, 295)
 9 Josh Sweat – Freshman (6'5, 237)
 11 Derrick Mitchell –  Senior (6'4, 305)
 12 Arthur Williams –  Freshman (6'4, 318)
 21 Chris Casher –  Junior (6'4, 256)
 41 Lorenzo Featherston – Sophomore (6'7, 229)
 44 DeMarcus Walker – Junior (6'3, 281)
 55 Fredrick Jones –  Freshman (6'2, 304)
 67 Adam Torres –  Freshman (6'4, 285)
 86 Darvin Taylor – Freshman (6'3, 308)
 90 Demarcus Christmas –  Freshman (6'3, 301)
 91 Derrick Nnadi – Sophomore (6'1, 301)
 92 Justin Shanks –  Junior (6'2 322)
 95 Keith Bryant –  Sophomore (6'2, 294)
 98 Rick Leonard – Sophomore (6'7, 281)
 99 Nile Lawrence-Stample –  Senior (6'1, 302)

|width="25"| 
|valign="top"|

Linebacker
 5 Reggie Northrup – Senior (6'1, 231)
 6 Matthew Thomas –  Sophomore (6'3, 225)
 16 Jacob Pugh – Sophomore (6'4, 239)
 18 Ro'Derrick Hoskins –  Sophomore (6'2, 238)
 22 Tyrell Lyons –  Sophomore (6'1, 219)
 24 Terrance Smith –  Senior (6'4, 230)
 30 Sh'Mar Kilby-Lane – Freshman (6'1, 212)
 35 Lorenzo Phillips – Junior (6'2, 225)
 45 Delvin Purifoy –  Freshman (6'2, 257)

Defensive back
 1 Tyler Hunter –  Senior (5'11, 198)
 3 Derwin James – Freshman (6'3, 212)
 7 Ryan Green – Junior (5'11, 201)
 8 Jalen Ramsey – Junior (6'1, 202)
 10 Calvin Brewton – Freshman (6'0, 178)
 13 Marcus Lewis – Freshman (6'1, 192)
 14 Javien Elliott –  Senior (5'11, 176)
 15 Tarvarus McFadden – Freshman (6'2, 197) 19 A.J. Westbrook – Freshman (6'0, 184) 20 Trey Marshall – Sophomore (6'0, 207) 27 Marquez White –  Sophomore (6'0, 184) 28 Malique Jackson – Sophomore (6'0, 176) 29 Nate Andrews – Junior (6'0, 206) 37 Keelin Smith –  Senior (6'3, 190) 42 Lamarcus Brutus –  Senior (6'0, 207)Special teams
 19 Roberto Aguayo –  Junior (6'1, 204) (K)
 38 Cason Beatty – Senior (6'3, 215) (P) (H)
 47 Stephen Gabbard – Sophomore (6'3, 217) (LS)
|}

Depth chart
(Depth Chart Notations: Name, Year at FSU/total years of eligibility, Games started in 2014)

Media
Florida State football is broadcast on the Florida State University Seminoles Radio Network and the games are called by Gene Deckerhoff.

Statistics

Scores by quarter (all opponents)

Scores by quarter (ACC opponents)

Rankings

Season
Florida State was picked to finish second in the ACC Atlantic. Roberto Aguayo, Roderick Johnson, Jalen Ramsey, and Terrance Smith were named to the preseason All-ACC team.

Schedule

Game summaries

Texas State

South Florida

Boston College

Wake Forest

Miami (FL)

Louisville

Georgia Tech

Syracuse

Clemson

NC State

Chattanooga

Florida

Peach Bowl: Houston

Awards
Jacobs Blocking Trophy
Roderick Johnson
Jim Brown Award
Dalvin Cook

WatchlistsPlayersJohnny Unitas Award
Everett Golson
Lott Trophy
Jalen Ramsey
Maxwell Award
Dalvin Cook
Everett Golson
Bednarik Award
Jalen Ramsey
Terrance Smith
Lou Groza Award
Roberto Aguayo
Outland Trophy
Roderick Johnson
Nagurski Award
Jalen Ramsey
Terrance Smith
Jim Thorpe Award
Jalen Ramsey
Lombardi Award
Reggie Northrup
Terrance Smith
Roderick Johnson
Butkus Award
Reggie Northrup
Terrance Smith
Walter Camp Award
Everett Golson
Wuerffel Trophy
Roberto Aguayo
Doak Walker Award
Dalvin Cook
Ray Guy Award
Cason BeattyCoachesDodd Trophy
Jimbo Fisher
Bear Bryant Award
Jimbo Fisher
Pre-season All-Americans
Roberto Aguayo (Lindy's, Athlon, Phil Steele, Sporting News, CBS Sports, ESPN, Sports Illustrated)
Jalen Ramsey (Lindy's, Athlon, Phil Steele, Sporting News, Sports Illustrated)
Dalvin Cook (Athlon)
Terrance Smith (Phil Steele)

FinalistsPlayersBurlsworth Trophy
Javien ElliottCoaches''
Broyles Award
Charles Kelly
Quarterfinalists
 Wuerffel Trophy
Cason Beatty
 Lott Trophy
Jalen Ramsey
Semifinalists
 Jim Thorpe Award
Jalen Ramsey
 Maxwell Award
Dalvin Cook
 Bednarik Award
Jalen Ramsey
 Lou Groza Award
Roberto Aguayo
 Lott Trophy
Jalen Ramsey
 Doak Walker Award
Dalvin Cook
 Walter Camp Award
Dalvin Cook

Honors
ACC Player of the Week
Everett Golson (Offensive back)
Dalvin Cook (Offensive back)
Roderick Johnson (Offensive lineman)
Jalen Ramsey (Defensive back)
Roberto Aguayo (Specialist)
Terrance Smith (Linebacker)
Trey Marshall (Defensive back)
DeMarcus Walker (Defensive lineman)
Kermit Whitfield (Receiver)
Jacob Pugh (Linebacker)
Travis Rudolph (Receiver)
Jacques Patrick (rookie)
Derwin James (Defensive back)
DeMarcus Walker (Defensive lineman)
In addition to conference honors, Dalvin Cook has been recognized by the Walter Camp Foundation and the Football Writers Association.

All-ACC

All-Americans
Jalen Ramsey was named a consensus All-American.

All-Star games

NFL draft
The following players were selected in the 2016 NFL Draft:

The following players signed as undrafted free agents:

Everett Golson joined the practice squad of the Hamilton Tiger-Cats in the Canadian Football League.

References

Bibliography
2015 Florida State Seminoles Football Media Guide

External links
 Season statistics

Florida State
Florida State Seminoles football seasons
Florida State Seminoles football